The Pointe d'Otemma is a mountain of the Swiss Pennine Alps, located south of the lake of Mauvoisin in the canton of Valais. It lies at western end of the chain separating the Brenay Glacier from the Otemma Glacier.

On the west side of the mountain lies the Chanrion Hut. The closest locality in the valley is Fionnay.

References

External links
 Pointe d'Otemma on Hikr

Mountains of the Alps
Alpine three-thousanders
Mountains of Switzerland
Mountains of Valais